Huaiyang District is a district in the prefecture-level city of Zhoukou in the east of Henan province, People's Republic of China. During the Spring and Autumn period the capital of the state of Chen was located there.

The Chinese Ma clique General Ma Biao led Hui forces to annihilate the Japanese at the Battle of Huaiyang.

Administrative divisions
As 2012, this district is divided to 6 towns and 13 townships.

Towns 

famous tourist attractions:Taihaoling(太昊陵)、Longhu Lake（龙湖）、Huaiyang Pingliangtai City Site（淮阳平粮台城址）.
Townships

Climate

References

County-level divisions of Henan